Lazo Majnov (born 24 April 1980) is a retired Macedonian handball player.

References

External links 
 Székelyudvarhelyi KC profile

1980 births
Living people